Em Are I is the fifth album by anti-folk artist Jeffrey Lewis, and the first credited to Jeffrey Lewis & The Junkyard (Lewis' backing band). Lewis revealed the following in an interview with Audio Antihero Records.

Track listing 
 CD RTRADCD514, LP RTRADLP514

 "Slogans"
 "Roll Bus Roll"
 "If Life Exists"
 "Broken Broken Broken Heart"
 "Whistle Past The Graveyard"
 "To Be Objectified"
 "The Upside-down Cross"
 "Bugs & Flowers"
 "Good Old Pig, Gone To Avalon"
 "It's Not Impossible"
 "Mini-Theme: Moocher From The Future"

References 

2009 albums
Jeffrey Lewis albums
Rough Trade Records albums